Webster City Municipal Airport  is a city-owned public-use airport located three nautical miles (6 km) southwest of the central business district of Webster City, in Hamilton County, Iowa, United States. It is included in the National Plan of Integrated Airport Systems for 2015–2019, which categorized it as a general aviation facility.

Facilities and aircraft 
Webster City Municipal Airport covers an area of 181 acres (73 ha) at an elevation of 1,122 feet (342 m) above mean sea level. It has two runways: 14/32 is 4,007 by 75 feet (1,221 x 23 m) with a concrete surface and 5/23 is 2,662 by 90 feet (811 x 27 m) with a turf surface.

For the 12-month period ending September 20, 2010, the airport had 11,250 aircraft operations, an average of 30 per day: 98.5% general aviation and 1.5% air taxi. At that time there were 15 aircraft based at this airport: 80% single-engine and 20% multi-engine.

References

External links 
 Webster City Municipal (EBS) at Iowa DOT airport directory
 Storm Flying Service, the fixed-base operator (FBO)
 Aerial image as of April 1994 from USGS The National Map
 

Airports in Iowa
Transportation buildings and structures in Hamilton County, Iowa